Willow Creek Summit is a mountain pass in the western United States in central Idaho, at an elevation of  above sea level. Traversed by US 93, it is located below the Lost River Range, in northeastern Custer County, within the Challis National Forest.

It marks the divide between the Big Lost River and Salmon River drainage areas.

External links
Idaho Transportation Dept. – web-cam of Willow Creek Summit
Visit Idaho.org – official state tourism site

Mountain passes of Idaho
Landforms of Custer County, Idaho
Transportation in Custer County, Idaho